The Cat Who'll Live Forever: The Final Adventures of Norton, the Perfect Cat, and His Imperfect Human is the third and final memoir by Peter Gethers that documents his life with his cat Norton, a Scottish Fold. It was preceded by A Cat Abroad and documents the final portion of Norton's life and the repercussions of Norton's death.

Reception
Publishers Weekly reviewed the book saying, that Gethers is "at his best" when talking about Norton, especially about "his own mixed feelings about Norton's success", noting the author's ambivalence, especially given that the cat was given an obituary in People along with "Stanley Kubrick, Joe DiMaggio and King Hussein". Eva Lautemann, of The Library Journal, reviewed the book saying, "This bittersweet story of a cat who teaches his human friend lessons in loving and coping with illness is essential for all public libraries.

External links
 School Library Journal

References

Scottish Fold
Scottish novels
American memoirs
American autobiographical novels
Novels about cats
2001 British novels